Lokis may refer to:

 Lokis (novella), an 1869 Prosper Mérimée horror novella
 Lokis (film), a 1970 Polish film directed by Janusz Majewski

See also 
 Lokys (disambiguation)